GBV may refer to:

 GB virus C
 Gbanu language
 Gender-based violence
 Glenbervie railway station, Victoria, Australia (Metro Trains station code)
 Guided by Voices, an American indie rock band